Richard Tandy (born 26 March 1948) is an English musician. He is best known as the keyboardist in the rock band Electric Light Orchestra ("ELO"). His palette of keyboards (including Minimoog, Clavinet, Mellotron, and piano) was an important ingredient in the group's sound, especially on the albums A New World Record, Out of the Blue, Discovery, and Time.

Tandy was inducted into the Rock and Roll Hall of Fame on 7 April 2017 as a member of Electric Light Orchestra.

Life and career
Tandy was born on 26 March 1948 in Birmingham and educated at Moseley School, where he first met future bandmate Bev Bevan. Tandy would later be reunited with Bevan in 1968 when he played the harpsichord on The Move's number one chart-topper "Blackberry Way" and briefly joined them live playing keyboards, but switched to bass while regular bassist Trevor Burton was sidelined due to a shoulder injury. When Burton was able to play again, Tandy left to join The Uglys.

In 1972, Tandy served as the bassist in the first live line-up of Electric Light Orchestra (originally a side project of The Move), before becoming the band's full-time keyboardist. He has collaborated musically with ELO frontman Jeff Lynne on many projects, among them songs for the Electric Dreams soundtrack, Lynne's solo album Armchair Theatre and Lynne-produced Dave Edmunds album Information.

Tandy's keyboards would be an integral part of ELO's sound, and included piano, Minimoog, Clavinet, Oberheim, Wurlitzer electric piano, Mellotron, Yamaha CS-80, ARP 2600, and harmonium. He was also proficient on guitar. On some albums he is also credited with vocals or backing vocals, without any specification of which songs. Tandy was Jeff Lynne's right-hand man in the studio and co-arranged the strings with Lynne and Louis Clark from Eldorado onwards.

In 1985, Tandy formed the Tandy Morgan Band featuring Dave Morgan and Martin Smith, both of whom had worked with ELO in live concerts. In 1985, the Tandy Morgan Band released the concept album Earthrise. A remastered version was released on CD on the Rock Legacy label in 2011. A follow-up to Earthrise with previously unpublished tracks was released as The BC Collection, containing one track written by Tandy: "Enola Sad".

Tandy is featured on every ELO album except 1971's No Answer, recorded by Wood, Lynne, Bevan, Bill Hunt and Steve Woolam prior to his arrival, and 2015's Alone in the Universe, on which all of the instruments aside from some percussion were played by Lynne. He was also credited as co-arranger from Eldorado onwards.  Some of the ideas for the ELO album titles conceived by Richard Tandy were A New World Record,  Out of the Blue, and Discovery.

In 2012, Tandy reunited with Lynne to record another ELO project, a live set of the band's biggest hits recorded at Lynne's Bungalow Palace home recording studio, which was broadcast on TV. In 2013, Tandy joined Lynne in performing two songs for Children In Need Rocks, "Livin' Thing" and "Mr Blue Sky". He was also part of ELO's set on Radio 2's Festival In A Day in September 2014, and played a piano solo on the song One More Time from Jeff Lynne's ELO 2019 album From Out of Nowhere, which marked his official return to ELO as a permanent member.

Equipment

After permanently switching from bass to keyboards, Tandy's initial onstage setup was of Minimoog synthesizer and Wurlitzer electric piano and occasionally grand piano (as seen on ELO's performance of "Roll Over Beethoven" on The Midnight Special), which he otherwise used mainly in the studio. However, he gradually added more keyboards to his stage and studio rig, notably the Hohner clavinet, mellotron (which was largely relegated to stage use), and other synthesizers, and he began to make more regular use of the grand piano both on stage and in the studio. He also used the Yamaha CS80, ARP 2600, ARP Omni, Polymoog, Micromoog, ARP Quadra,  and Oberheim synthesizers from the late 1970s to the early 1980s. Tandy played a harmonium on "Kuiama" on ELO 2.

Personal life
Tandy's first marriage was to Carol "Cookie", a friend of Cleo Odzer, but the marriage ended in divorce; he is now married to his second wife, Sheila. He has lived variously in Birmingham, France, and Los Angeles, but currently resides in Wales.

References

1948 births
Living people
20th-century English musicians
20th-century British male musicians
21st-century English musicians
21st-century British male musicians
British male pianists
Electric Light Orchestra members
English expatriates in France
English expatriates in the United States
English keyboardists
English rock bass guitarists
English rock guitarists
English rock keyboardists
English rock pianists
English pianists
English songwriters
Harmonium players
Male bass guitarists
Musicians from Birmingham, West Midlands
People educated at Moseley School
Progressive rock keyboardists
The Move members